GREC may refer to:

 Greenpoint Renaissance Enterprise Corporation, a consortium of neighborhood organizations in North Brooklyn
 Group for Reflection among Catholics, a dialogue among traditionalist Catholics in France